Kimmo Eskelinen (born April 4, 1983) is a Swedish floorball player (defenseman) of Finnish descent. In the 2013/14 season, he plays for Partille IBS. He has played in the Swedish national team (World Cup title in 2006). He is famous for his extremely hard shot.

References 

1983 births
Living people
Swedish floorball players
Swedish people of Finnish descent
21st-century Swedish people